The 1962 Japan Series was the Nippon Professional Baseball (NPB) championship series for the 1962 season. It was the 13th Japan Series and featured the Pacific League champions, the Toei Flyers, against the Central League champions, the Hanshin Tigers.

Summary

Matchups

Game 1
Saturday, October 13, 1962 – 1:01 pm at Koshien Stadium in Nishinomiya, Hyōgo Prefecture

Game 2
Sunday, October 14, 1962 – 1:08 pm at Koshien Stadium in Nishinomiya, Hyōgo Prefecture

Game 3
Tuesday, October 16, 1962 – 1:00 pm at Meiji Jingu Stadium in Shinjuku, Tokyo

Game 4
Wednesday, October 17, 1962 – 1:00 pm at Meiji Jingu Stadium in Shinjuku, Tokyo

Game 5
Thursday, October 18, 1962 – 1:01 pm at Korakuen Stadium in Bunkyō, Tokyo

Game 6
Saturday, October 20, 1962 – 1:00 pm at Koshien Stadium in Nishinomiya, Hyōgo Prefecture

Game 7
Sunday, October 21, 1962 – 1:01 pm at Koshien Stadium in Nishinomiya, Hyōgo Prefecture

See also
1962 World Series

References

Japan Series
Japan Series
Japan Series
Japan Series